Shamsurin Abdul Rahman is a midfielder who last played for Woodlands Wellington FC in the S-League.

Shamsurin made his first appearance in the S-League with Balestier Khalsa on 21 April 2011 and played for the Tigers during the 2011 season. 

He then joined his former coach at Balestier Khalsa, Salim Moin, and as his teammates Ahmadulhaq Che Omar, Armanizam Dolah and K. Sathiaraj in their move over to Woodlands Wellington FC in 2012.

On 23 November 2012, it was announced by Woodlands Wellington that he would not be retained for the 2013 season. He then left for National Football League Division 1 side. Admiralty FC.He is now married to Nazeerah Binte Mohammad Nazir.

Club Career Statistics

Shamsurin Abdul Rahman's Profile

All numbers encased in brackets signify substitute appearances.

References

Singaporean footballers
Living people
1986 births
Balestier Khalsa FC players
Woodlands Wellington FC players
Singapore Premier League players
Association football midfielders